Cerastium fontanum, also called mouse-ear chickweed, common mouse-ear, or starweed, is a species of mat-forming perennial or, rarely, annual plant. It is native to Europe but introduced elsewhere. Its identifying characteristics are tear-shaped leaves growing opposite one another in a star pattern, hairy leaves, and small white flowers. Mouse-ear chickweed typically grows to 4"-8" tall and spreads horizontally along the ground via the formation of roots wherever the stem falls over and contacts the ground.

Description

Cerastium fontanum is a low growing plant covered with small hairs which are not sticky, that is, without glandular tips. It has prostrate branches which do not bear flowers. The petals are shorter than the sepals or a little longer and are deeply divided. The flowers have 10 stamens with 5 styles.

Habitat
It is common in grassland and along roadsides.

Distribution
It is common throughout Great Britain and Ireland.

Etymology
Cerastium is derived from the Greek word for 'horned', in reference to the shape of its fruit capsule.

Fontanum means 'of fountains', 'of springs', or 'of fast-running streams'. It is a cognate with 'fountain' and 'font'.

References

fontanum
Invasive plant species of subantarctic islands